Jon-Rae Fletcher is a Canadian singer-songwriter. He has recorded both as a solo artist and with a back-up band, The River.

Background
Fletcher grew up in Kelowna, British Columbia, where as the son of a minister, he sang in his church's choir. Eventual musical developments included his discovery of Kurt Cobain and the formation of his own garage band. Jon-Rae later moved and founded the original River band with a collective of Vancouver friends, but disbanded the group when he moved east.

The River was reformed with like-minded Toronto musicians in 2003, and they grew into a popular cult band with an ever-expanding audience. Combining country, gospel, rock, and soul, Jon-Rae & The River created a unique blend of music, sometimes complemented by an on-stage choir. In 2006, Exclaim! labeled Fletcher "one of Toronto’s most captivating front-men, thanks to his impassioned performances and his glorious alt-gospel songs. Fuelled by alcohol and a fervent belief in the songs they're playing." Their critically acclaimed album Knows What You Need was released in 2006, but the band broke up soon afterward.

Fletcher moved back out west, settling in Brentwood Bay, British Columbia. He released the full length Oh, Maria on (weewerk) in 2009 and toured to promote the album with a new band lineup. Several of his former backing musicians in The River later re-emerged with the alternative country band One Hundred Dollars.

Discography
 Now Then (2000), Deerandbird Records
 Then Again (2001), Deerandbird Records
 The Road (2003), 	Hive-Fi Recordings
 Just A Closer Walk (2004), Blocks Recording Club
 Jon-Rae Fletcher & The River, Live Series (2005), Deerandbird Records
 Old Songs for the New Town (2005), Permafrost Records
 Knows What You Need (2006), We Are Busy Bodies
 Oh, Maria (2009), Weewerk

References

Canadian guitarists
Canadian rock singers
Canadian country singer-songwriters
Living people
Musicians from Kelowna
Year of birth missing (living people)
Canadian male guitarists
Canadian male singer-songwriters